The Lowndesboro Historic District is a historic district in Lowndesboro, Alabama, United States. It was placed on the National Register of Historic Places on December 12, 1973. Architectural styles include the Gothic Revival, Greek Revival, and other Victorian styles.

Contributing Properties

References

Gothic Revival architecture in Alabama
Greek Revival architecture in Alabama
National Register of Historic Places in Lowndes County, Alabama
Historic districts in Lowndes County, Alabama
Historic districts on the National Register of Historic Places in Alabama